In mathematical logic and computer science, the calculus of constructions (CoC) is a type theory created by Thierry Coquand. It can serve as both a typed programming language and as constructive foundation for mathematics. For this second reason, the CoC and its variants have been the basis for Coq and other proof assistants.

Some of its variants include the calculus of inductive constructions (which adds inductive types), the calculus of (co)inductive constructions (which adds coinduction), and the predicative calculus of inductive constructions (which removes some impredicativity).

General traits
The CoC is a higher-order typed lambda calculus, initially developed by Thierry Coquand. It is well known for being at the top of Barendregt's lambda cube. It is possible within CoC to define functions from terms to terms, as well as terms to types, types to types, and types to terms.

The CoC is strongly normalizing, and hence consistent.

Usage 

The CoC has been developed alongside the Coq proof assistant. As features were added (or possible liabilities removed) to the theory, they became available in Coq.

Variants of the CoC are used in other proof assistants, such as Matita.

The basics of the calculus of constructions

The calculus of constructions can be considered an extension of the Curry–Howard isomorphism. The Curry–Howard isomorphism associates a term in the simply typed lambda calculus with each natural-deduction proof in intuitionistic propositional logic. The calculus of constructions extends this isomorphism to proofs in the full intuitionistic predicate calculus, which includes proofs of quantified statements (which we will also call "propositions").

Terms

A term in the calculus of constructions is constructed using the following rules:

  is a term (also called type);
  is a term (also called prop, the type of all propositions);
 Variables are terms;
 ,
 .

In other words, the term syntax, in BNF, is then:

The calculus of constructions has five kinds of objects:
 proofs, which are terms whose types are propositions;
 propositions, which are also known as small types;
 predicates, which are functions that return propositions;
 large types, which are the types of predicates ( is an example of a large type);
  itself, which is the type of large types.

Judgments

The calculus of constructions allows proving typing judgments:

Which can be read as the implication

 If variables  have, respectively, types , then term  has type .

The valid judgments for the calculus of constructions are derivable from a set of inference rules. In the following, we use  to mean a sequence of type assignments 
We shall write  to mean the result of substituting the term  for the free variable  in the term .

An inference rule is written in the form

which means

 If  is a valid judgment, then so is

Inference rules for the calculus of constructions

1. 

2. 

3. 

4. 

5. 

6.

Defining logical operators

However, this one operator is sufficient to define all the other logical operators:

Defining data types

The basic data types used in computer science can be defined within the calculus of constructions:

 Booleans  
 Naturals  
 Product   
 Disjoint union   

Note that Booleans and Naturals are defined in the same way as in Church encoding. However, additional problems arise from propositional extensionality and proof irrelevance.

See also
 Pure type system
 Lambda cube
 System F
 Dependent type
 Intuitionistic type theory
 Homotopy type theory

References 

 
 Also available freely accessible online:   Note terminology is rather different. For instance, is written [x : A] B.
 
 
  — An application of the CoC

Dependently typed programming
Lambda calculus
Type theory